Pogonocherus arizonicus is a species of beetle in the family Cerambycidae. It was described by Gottlieb August Wilhelm Herrich-Schäffer in 1908. It is known from Mexico and the United States.

References

Pogonocherini
Beetles described in 1908